Ster-Kinekor is a South African-based cinema company, and the country's largest movie exhibitor. It represents 60-65% of the market, having 56 cinema complexes consisting of 400 screens and 64,000 seats; 154 of those screens being 3D cinemas. It has 9 IMAX cinemas, 13 Cine Prestige cinemas, 3 Nouveau cinemas and 5 D-BOX cinemas.

Its head office is at the Ster-Kinekor Office Park in Sandton, Johannesburg.

History
The company originated in 1969 when 20th Century Fox decided to sell off its South African cinema business to Sanlam, an insurance company. Sanlam had already been operating Ster Theatres and Ster Films under the Ster brand. Government regulation required that the two film companies be operated separately, so the company name Kinekor was created to manage the newly acquired business.

Throughout the 1970s, Kinekor embarked on a program of opening new cinemas across South Africa. However, due to the introduction of television in 1976, cinema attendances dropped. The South African government approved of the merger of Sanlamʼs two cinema divisions, creating Ster-Kinekor.

Despite poor market conditions, Ster-Kinekor continued its program of building high-quality cinema multiplexes, focusing on integrating cinemas into large retail and leisure developments.

Expansion into Europe

The end of South Africaʼs isolation in 1994 also introduced a free market, allowing Ster-Kinekor to expand into foreign markets. Three company directors moved their base of operations to the United Kingdom and set up trading as Ster Century. The newly founded company entered into partnership with Assos Odeon, a cinema exhibition company in Greece, and opened its first multiplex cinema in 1998 under the name Ster Odeon.

In 1999, Ster Century continued its expansion opening multiplex cinemas in Dublin, Ireland; Brno, Czech Republic; Wroclaw and Warsaw, Poland; and two sites in Budapest, Hungary. This trend continued in 2000, with two additional sites in Poland and the Czech Republic, and more in the UK (Edinburgh, Romford and Norwich), Spain, Montenegro, Greece, Slovakia, and Serbia.

Leaving Europe

By 2002, Ster Century had sold off its interests in Poland, Greece, Hungary, and the Czech Republic to concentrate on its UK business. Cinemas were opened in Leeds, Basingstoke, and Cardiff. Polish cinemas were sold to the Israeli company Cinema City International.

In 2003, Ster-Kinekor sold off its remaining European cinema interests with Ster Centuryʼs UK business being bought by Aurora Entertainment in a management buyout.

Competition
In South Africa, Ster-Kinekor holds the largest market share in its industry, followed by Nu Metro Cinemas. Smaller, independent operators, including CineCentre, Movies@, and Epic Cinemas, make up the rest of the market.

References

External links

Official Ster-Kinekor website

Cinema chains in South Africa
Culture of Johannesburg
Companies based in Sandton